Walter Frederick William Pape (1903–1979) was a British cinematographer and the elder brother of actress Lilian Harvey.  He was born on 9 February 1903 in Hornsey, London.

Selected filmography

 The Man from Chicago (1930)
 Love Lies (1931)
 Hobson's Choice (1931)
Strip! Strip! Hooray!!! (1932)
 His Wife's Mother (1932)
 The Love Nest (1933)
 Their Night Out (1933)
 Money Talks (1933)
 Facing the Music (1933)
 Bulldog Drummond at Bay (1937)
 The Dominant Sex (1937)
 Just William (1940)
 The House of the Arrow (1940)
 The Flying Squad (1940)
 It Happened to One Man (1940)
 Spring Meeting (1941)
 Tower of Terror (1941)
 Badger's Green (1949)
 Dark Secret (1949)
 Cloudburst (1951)
 A Case for PC 49 (1951)
 To Have and to Hold (1951)
 Whispering Smith Hits London (1952)
 Stolen Face (1952)
 Death of an Angel (1952)
 Wings of Danger (1952)
 Blood Orange (1953)
 Face the Music (1954)
 Murder by Proxy (1954)
 The House Across the Lake (1954)
 Life with the Lyons (1954)
 The Men of Sherwood Forest (1954)
 Mask of Dust (1954)
 The Lyons in Paris (1955)
 The Quatermass Xperiment (1955)
 Women Without Men (1956)
 Kill Her Gently (1957)
 Account Rendered (1957)
 West of Suez (1957)
 Death Over My Shoulder (1958)
Spy in the Sky! (1958)
 Naked Fury (1959)
 Jungle Street (1960)
 Operation Cupid (1960)
 The Hand (1960)
 Three Spare Wives (1962)
 Emergency (1962)
 The Spanish Sword (1962)
 Night of the Prowler (1962)
 Danger by My Side (1962)
 The Hi-Jackers (1963)

References
Notes

External links
 

1903 births
1979 deaths
British cinematographers